Anarthruridae is a family of crustaceans belonging to the order Tanaidacea.

Genera
Genera:
Abrotanais Gellert & Błażewicz, 2018
Acinoproskelos Bamber & Błażewicz-Paszkowycz, 2013
Anarthrura Sars, 1882
Anarthrurella Bird, 2004
Anarthruropsis Lang, 1968
Anisopechys Bird, 2004
Crenicarpus Drumm & Bird, 2016
Ithyomus Bird, 2004
Keska Błażewicz-Paszkowycz, Bamber & Jóźwiak, 2013
Macilenta Gellert & Błażewicz, 2018
Olokun Jóźwiak & Błażewicz, 2017
Siphonolabrum Lang, 1972
Siphonolabrum Lang, 1971 (nomen nudum)
Synanarthrura Bird, 2004
Thorkelius Bird, 2004
Tsuranarthrura Kakui & Tomioka, 2018
Waki Gellert & Błażewicz, 2018

References

Tanaidacea
Crustacean families